Kim Man-su (September 14, 1956) is a politician of the Democratic People's Republic of Korea (North Korea). He is also a member of the Minister of Electric Power Industry in the Cabinet of North Korea as well as member of the Central Committee of the Workers' Party of Korea.

Biography
He was born on September 14, 1956 in North Hamgyong Province. He has been the Minister of Electric Power Industry as a successor since April 2012. In May 2016, in the 7th Congress of the Workers' Party of Korea he was appointed a member of the Central Committee of the Workers 'Party. In March 2014, he was elected to the 13th convocation of the Supreme People's Assembly.

References

Members of the Supreme People's Assembly
Workers' Party of Korea politicians
Government ministers of North Korea
1956 births
Living people
People from North Hamgyong